Ehrmandale is an unincorporated community in southern Nevins Township, Vigo County, in the U.S. state of Indiana.

It is part of the Terre Haute metropolitan area.

History
Ehrmandale was known as Elsie until 1898. A post office was established under this name in 1896, was renamed Ehrmandale in 1898, and was discontinued in 1905.

Geography

References

Unincorporated communities in Indiana
Unincorporated communities in Vigo County, Indiana
Terre Haute metropolitan area